Khalanga (also called Darchula) is a town and the district headquarters of the Darchula District in the Sudurpashchim Province of Nepal. It is part of the Mahakali Municipality in the Mahakali Zone.  The town is located on the bank of Mahakali River and the border with Uttarakhand state, India.  The town on the Indian side of the border also has similar name, spelt as Dharchula.

Mahakali river is the border between Nepal and India. There is suspension bridge that connects the towns on the two sides. Indian and Nepalese nationals can cross the border without any restriction. The border is closed at night for security reasons. Although it is common for Nepalese nationals to go to India for buying goods, they need to go through the customs checkpoint established in both (India and Nepal) sides.

Demographics
At the time of the 2001 Nepal census it had a population of 4,422 people living in 809 individual households.

References

External links
Khalanga village boundary, OpenStreetMap
Darchula district map, United Nations in Nepal, 4 March 2008
Municipalities of Darchula District, United Nations in Nepal.
Api Nampa Conservation Area, onlinedarchula.eu.org

Populated places in Darchula District
Transit and customs posts along the India–Nepal border
Divided cities